Meacham syndrome is a rare genetic disorder which is characterized by lung, diaphragmatic and genitourinary anomalies.

Signs and symptoms 

Often people with this condition are born with both underdeveloped lungs and a herniated diaphragm.

Urinary symptoms include a horseshoe kidney

Genital symptoms are different according to the biological sex of the baby, genetic males (46,XY) usually have pseudohermaphroditism, ambiguous genitalia, and perineal hypospadias. Genetic females (46,XX) often have septate uterus and duplication of the vagina. In some cases, karyotype is needed to know the biological sex of the baby.

Additional symptoms include neoplasm, cryptorchidism, ventricular septal defect, atrial septal defect, hernia, patent ductus arteriosus, Tetralogy of Fallot, and penile hypoplasia.

Causes 

This condition is caused by an autosomal dominant missense mutation in the WT1 gene, in chromosome 11. This was found through two half-siblings reported by Suri et al.

Epidemiology 

According to OMIM, only 12 cases have been described in medical literature.

References 

Genetic diseases and disorders
Rare genetic syndromes
Congenital disorders of urinary system
Congenital disorders of respiratory system
Congenital disorders of genital organs
Syndromes affecting the respiratory system